Martina Navratilova defeated Helena Suková in the final, 6–3, 6–2 to win the women's singles tennis title at the 1986 US Open. It was her third US Open singles title and 15th major singles title overall. Navratilova became the first woman in the Open Era to win a major after saving match points en route, saving three against Steffi Graf in the semifinals.

Hana Mandlíková was the defending champion, but lost in the fourth round to Wendy Turnbull.

Seeds
The seeded players are listed below. Martina Navratilova is the champion; others show the round in which they were eliminated.

  Martina Navratilova (champion)
  Chris Evert (semifinalist)
  Steffi Graf (semifinalist)
  Hana Mandlíková (fourth round)
  Pam Shriver (quarterfinalist)
  Claudia Kohde-Kilsch (fourth round)
  Helena Suková (finalist)
  Bonnie Gadusek (quarterfinalist)
  Manuela Maleeva (quarterfinalist)
  Kathy Rinaldi (first round)
  Gabriela Sabatini (fourth round)
  Zina Garrison (fourth round)
  Stephanie Rehe (fourth round)
  Catarina Lindqvist (fourth round)
  Kathy Jordan (fourth round)
  Carling Bassett (first round)

Qualifying

Draw

Key
 Q = Qualifier
 WC = Wild card
 LL = Lucky loser
 r = Retired

Final eight

Earlier rounds

Section 1

Section 2

Section 3

Section 4

Section 5

Section 6

Section 7

Section 8

External links
1986 US Open – Women's draws and results at the International Tennis Federation

Women's Singles
US Open (tennis) by year – Women's singles
1986 in women's tennis
1986 in American women's sports